is a former Japanese football player.

Playing career
Yoshiaki Kinoshita was born in Tokushima Prefecture. He joined to his local club; Tokushima Vortis in 2013. On March 19, 2014, he debuted in J.League Cup (v Albirex Niigata). He played three games in J.League Cup. In 2015, he moved to FC Osaka. He retired in December 2015.

References

External links

1990 births
Living people
Association football defenders
Chuo University alumni
Association football people from Tokushima Prefecture
Japanese footballers
J1 League players
J2 League players
Japan Football League players
Tokushima Vortis players
FC Osaka players